Michel Bibollet (born 24 March 1963) is a French former professional racing cyclist. He rode in two editions of the Tour de France.

References

External links
 

1963 births
Living people
French male cyclists
Sportspeople from Haute-Savoie
Cyclists from Auvergne-Rhône-Alpes